Bernette Beyers (born 17 January 1992) is a South African female track cyclist. She claimed gold in the 500m time trial at the 2017 African Cycling Championships.

Career 
She began her cycling career in 2013. In 2015, she won six medals at the Western Cape Provincial Championships. Bernette went onto participate at the first round of the 2016-17 UCI Track Cycling World Cup which was held in Glasgow, Scotland. During the competition, she met with an accident and broke her collarbone (clavicle).

References

External links 

 Profile at Strava
 Profile at Cyclingarchives

1992 births
Living people
South African female cyclists
People from Stellenbosch
Sportspeople from the Western Cape
21st-century South African women